The Carolina Cougars were  a basketball franchise in the American Basketball Association that existed from 1969 through 1974. The Cougars were originally a charter member of the ABA as the Houston Mavericks in 1967. The Mavericks moved to North Carolina in late 1969 after two unsuccessful seasons in Houston at the Sam Houston Coliseum.

History

Early years in Carolina
The Carolina Cougars franchise began when future Lieutenant Governor of North Carolina Jim Gardner bought the Houston Mavericks and moved them to North Carolina in 1969. At the time, none of North Carolina's large metropolitan areas – Charlotte, the Piedmont Triad and the Triangle – was large enough to support a professional team on its own. With this in mind, Gardner decided to brand the Cougars as a "regional" team. Gardner sold the team after one season to Ted Munchak, who poured significant resources into the team.

The Cougars were based in Greensboro and played most of their home games at the Greensboro Coliseum, the state's largest arena at the time.  Games were also regularly played in Charlotte at the (original) Charlotte Coliseum and in Raleigh at Dorton Arena and Reynolds Coliseum. In early 1972, three regular season games were played in Winston-Salem at the Winston-Salem Memorial Coliseum, and one game was played at Fort Bragg.

Early on, the Cougars were not especially successful on the court, posting a 42–42 record in the 1969–70 season, a 34–50 record in 1970–71, and a 35–49 record in 1971–72. The 1969–70 Cougars managed to make the ABA playoffs but lost in the Eastern Division Semifinals (first round) to a much stronger Indiana Pacers team. In spite of this, the Cougars had a good fan following, particularly in Greensboro.

The 1971–72 team was coached by former NBA All-Star Tom Meschery, who had just retired from 10 years of NBA play with the San Francisco Warriors and the Seattle SuperSonics.

Success under Larry Brown

In 1972–73, the Cougars hired retired ABA players Larry Brown and former Cougar Doug Moe as coaches. The 1972–73 Cougars were fairly talented and featured players Billy Cunningham, Joe Caldwell, and Mack Calvin. All three appeared in the ABA All-Star Game that season, and Cunningham was named the league's Most Valuable Player.

Carolina went on to post a 57–27 record, which was the best in the ABA. The Cougars beat the New York Nets in their first-round playoff series 4 games to 1, but lost a close series to the Kentucky Colonels 4 games to 3 in the Eastern Division finals. There were many upset and disappointed fans in Greensboro when the Cougars decided to hold game 7 of the series in Charlotte. Of the 42 scheduled regular season home games, 25 were usually scheduled for Greensboro while only 12 were played in Charlotte. With Cougar management having the choice of city to play game 7, it mystified its Greensboro area fans with the choice to play such a pivotal game on a less familiar court. Game 7 was hotly contested but Kentucky prevailed, much to Cougar fans dismay.

The 1973–74 Cougars started the season strong, winning 17 of their first 22 games. Despite injuries and internal squabbles, the Cougars posted a 47–37 record but were swept in the Eastern Division semifinals 4 games to 0 by the Kentucky Colonels.

Move to St. Louis
1973–74 turned out to be the Cougars' last season in North Carolina.  Although they were moderately successful overall and had one of the most loyal fan bases in the ABA, talks toward an ABA–NBA merger were in the final stages, and it had become apparent that a "regional" franchise would not be viable in the NBA.  Although the Charlotte/Greensboro/Raleigh axis (the Piedmont Crescent or I-85 Corridor) was beginning an unprecedented period of growth, none of these cities was big enough at the time to support an NBA team on its own.  Additionally, several persons quoted in the book Loose Balls by Terry Pluto say the added travel expenses incurred by the regional concept ultimately proved insurmountable.  Munchak sold the Cougars to a consortium of New York businessmen headed by brothers Ozzie and Daniel Silna, who moved to St. Louis as the Spirits of St. Louis.  However, the new owners assembled an almost entirely new team after moving to St. Louis; only a few players from the 1973–74 Cougars suited up for the 1974–75 Spirits.

The Spirits were one of two teams that lasted until the very end of the league but not join the NBA; the other was the Kentucky Colonels (the Virginia Squires folded after the final ABA regular season ended but before the ABA–NBA merger due to their inability to meet a league-mandated financial assessment after the season ended.). At the time of the ABA–NBA merger, the Spirits' owners planned to move the team to Salt Lake City, Utah to play as the Utah Rockies; instead, it's players were dealt in the 1976 ABA dispersal draft.

Legacy
Professional basketball would return to North Carolina in 1988 when the Charlotte Hornets entered the NBA.

Carl Scheer, who won Executive of the Year as a member of the Cougars, would later become the first executive of the NBA's Charlotte Hornets. Cougars point guard Gene Littles would become an assistant coach, an executive, and the second head coach of the Hornets. Larry Brown, who coached the Cougars for two seasons and won Coach of the Year during his tenure, would eventually become the eighth head coach of Charlotte's NBA franchise.

Two teams in other professional sports leagues include Carolina in their branding: the Carolina Panthers of the National Football League, and the Carolina Hurricanes of the National Hockey League. The former team is based in Charlotte, and the latter team in Raleigh.

Beginning in 2012, the Cougars' uniforms were worn by the Bobcats/Hornets under the NBA Hardwood Classics moniker.

Franchise records, awards and honors

Individual awards

Most Valuable Player
 Billy Cunningham – 1973

Coach of the Year
 Larry Brown – 1973

Executive of the Year
 Carl Scheer – 1973

All-ABA First Team
 Bob Verga – 1970
 Billy Cunningham – 1973
 Mack Calvin – 1974

All-ABA Second Team
 Joe Caldwell – 1971
 Mack Calvin – 1973

All-Defensive Team
 Joe Caldwell – 1973
 Ted McClain – 1974

All-Rookie Team
 Dennis Wuycik – 1973

All-Star Game
All-Star Selections
Doug Moe – 1970
Bob Verga – 1970
Joe Caldwell – 1971, 1973
Wendell Ladner – 1972
Jim McDaniels – 1972
Mack Calvin – 1973, 1974
Billy Cunningham – 1973
Ted McClain – 1974

Basketball Hall of Famers

Season-by-season records

All-time records

References

External links
Remember the ABA: Carolina Cougars
Remember the ABA: Carolina Cougars year-to-year rosters

 
American Basketball Association teams
Defunct basketball teams in the United States
Defunct companies based in North Carolina
Basketball teams in North Carolina
Spirits of St. Louis
Basketball teams established in 1969
Basketball teams disestablished in 1974